Dr. Fabian: Laughing Is the Best Medicine (originally Dr. med. Fabian — Lachen ist die beste Medizin) is a 1969 West German film directed by Harald Reinl.

It was shot at the Spandau Studios in Berlin.

Plot summary

Cast 
Hans-Joachim Kulenkampff as Dr. med. Paul Fabian
Martin Held as Professor Felix Spalke
Maria Perschy as Dr. Inge Vollmer
Elisabeth Flickenschildt as Oberschwester Esmeralda
Gisela Uhlen as Henriette Gambaroff
Agnes Windeck as Frau Nachtigall
Ulrike Blome as Susanne
Arthur Richelmann as Joachim Dorn
Monika Peitsch as Renate Lürsen
Hubert von Meyerinck as General von Kottwitz
Elsa Wagner as Kgl. Hoheit
Edith Schneider as Frau Dorn
Martin Jente as Herr Martin
Beate Hasenau as Carla Ritter
Hans Terofal as Furtmayer
Otto Graf as Konsul Lürsen
Kurd Pieritz
Harry Tagore

Soundtrack

External links 

1969 films
1969 comedy films
German comedy films
West German films
1960s German-language films
Films directed by Harald Reinl
Films set in hospitals
Films shot at Spandau Studios
1960s German films